Tanya Gyani is an interior designer.

Biography
Gyani graduated from the National Institute of Fashion Technology in New Delhi, India and completed her Masters in Interior Design from Florence, Italy where she was awarded the Elite Student Award of the FDA.
Tanya is a Delhi based globally famous interior designer from India.

Influences
Living and studying in Florence and the South of France stemmed Tanya's greatest influences. She states "In France, I went to the Domaine de Boisbuchet for a course in Exhibition Design conducted by the Vitra Design Museum and Centre Georges Pompidou, which I recommend to anybody even remotely interested in heightening their creative senses because both the location and course structure is highly conducive to conceptualizing and exploring new ideas." Tanya also gathered further design insight from being engrossed within the origin of the Renaissance and the antiquity and culture behind it.

References

External links 
 Tanya Gyani's Official Website
 'A Glam Life' India Today Home Jan 2012
 Best Interior Designers in Delhi "Dezine Innovation"

Indian interior designers
Living people
National Institute of Fashion Technology alumni
Indian women designers
20th-century Indian designers
Artists from Chandigarh
Women artists from Chandigarh
Year of birth missing (living people)
20th-century Indian women